Conrad Grubb Homestead is a historic home located near Schwenksville, Upper Frederick Township, Montgomery County, Pennsylvania.  It was built in 1754, and is a -story Germanic style dwelling.  It is built of red and gray shale and sandstone.

It was added to the National Register of Historic Places in 1973.

References

Houses on the National Register of Historic Places in Pennsylvania
Houses completed in 1754
Houses in Montgomery County, Pennsylvania
1754 establishments in Pennsylvania
National Register of Historic Places in Montgomery County, Pennsylvania
Upper Frederick Township, Montgomery County, Pennsylvania